Bahour is one of 5 Communes in Pondicherry district in the Indian territory of Puducherry. Bahour Commune comes under Bahour taluk  of Puducherry district. Nettapakkam is another commune under Bahour taluk.

Panchayat villages
The following are 15 panchayat villages under Bahour Commune, viz.

References

External links
 Department of Revenue and Disaster Management, Government of Puducherry

Communes of Pondicherry